The 1933 Kilkenny Senior Hurling Championship was the 39th staging of the Kilkenny Senior Hurling Championship since its establishment by the Kilkenny County Board.

On 1 October 1933, Tullaroan won the championship after a 6-05 to 5-04 defeat of Carrickshock in the final. It was their 16th championship title overall and their first title in three championship seasons.

Results

Final

References

Kilkenny Senior Hurling Championship
Kilkenny Senior Hurling Championship